Magnus, in comics, may refer to:

 Magnus Lehnsherr, an alternate reality Marvel Comics character; the son of Rogue and Magneto
 Magnus the Sorcerer, a fictional character in the Marvel Universe
 Magnus, Robot Fighter, a comics character created by Russ Manning 
 Will Magnus, a scientist character in the DC Comics universe

See also
 Magnus (disambiguation)
 Roberto Raviola, an Italian comic book artist who used Magnus as a pseudonym

References